In healthcare, an orderly (also known as a ward assistant, nurse assistant or healthcare assistant) is a hospital attendant whose job consists of assisting medical and nursing staff with various nursing and medical interventions. The highest role of an orderly is that of an operations assistant. An operations assistant requires people who are knowledgeable in advanced medical terminology and assist with specialist surgery setups, and typically an operations assistant understands more about surgical procedures than does a registered nurse working outside of theatres. An operations assistant is a direct assistant to consultant-level doctors more than to nurses. These duties are classified as routine tasks involving no risk for the patient.

Job details

Orderlies are often utilized in various hospital departments. Orderly duties can range in scope depending on the area of the health care facility they are employed. For that reason, duties can range from assisting in the physical restraint of combative patients, assisting physicians with the application of casts, transporting patients, shaving patients and providing other similar routine personal care to setting up specialised hospital equipment such as bed traction arrays.

Orderlies are typically found in emergency departments, operating rooms, psychiatry, long-term care, and orthopaedics.

Orderlies are described as non licensed hospital assistants that are instructed to perform delegated functions under the direct supervision of a licensed practitioner in the health care setting.

In the US, orderlies have been phased out of health care facilities in recent years and their functions are now replaced by the patient care assistant and Certified Nursing Assistant. They remain common in Canada and other countries.

Orderlies in UK hospitals were known as "attendants" (primarily in lunatic asylums), but that role has been phased out. The nearest role left to a male hospital assistant is that of porter, but that is more a logistical role, moving patients and equipment around the hospital. This is not to be confused with healthcare assistants (HCAs) who are essentially carers for patients (not qualified or licensed health care professionals), and may be of both sexes.

A common set up among hospitals in Australia is seen at the Royal Adelaide Hospital in Adelaide, South Australia. At the RAH the orderly service is contracted to Spotless, a national corporation. There are around 80 orderlies employed by Spotless at the Royal Adelaide alone. Here, they are tasked with the movement of patients and equipment between wards and departments, the movement of patients from ambulances in triage, the movement of patients from MedStar retrieval helicopters that land at the hospital, the movement of deceased patients to the mortuary and various other tasks. They respond to every MET (medical emergency team) call that originates within the hospital to provide extra oxygen and so that the patient is able to be moved to another area (such as the intensive care unit) as soon as is required. The orderlies are dispatched using pager-radio combos. Some orderlies are stationed at particular departments such as radiology and theatre/recovery but most are in the "pool" and are dispatched throughout the hospital. In The Royal Brisbane and Womans Hospital in Queensland, orderlies are called patient support officers or PSOs. Controversially, PSOs are required to do all cleaning within the hospital, leading to an outcry from staff that the practice is unsafe because PSOs have to not only clean, but also take care of the patient handling, leading to a possible increase in the spread of infection.

See also

 Certified Nursing Assistant
 Activities of daily living assistance

References

External links
 

Health care occupations